Fernando Luis Giarrizo (in some sources, Giarrizzo; born January 17, 1985, in Mendoza, Argentina) is an Argentine midfielder currently playing for S.K. Victoria Wanderers F.C. first division of Malta.

Career 
He played during his career in the Scottish First Division for Livingston F.C. He also played in his homeland with Godoy Cruz Antonio Tomba, Brown de Adrogué, Club Atlético Platense, Independiente Rivadavia, Club Deportivo Maipu, Deportivo Morón, Gimnasia y Esgrima de Concepción del Uruguay, Futbol Club Ferro Carril Sud; as well for Chilean club Deportes Naval, Portuguese club Associação Naval 1º de Maio and Bolivian side  Sport Boys Warnes.

Teams
  Godoy Cruz (2003-2004)
  Brown de Adrogué (2005)
  Platense (2005-2006)
  Independiente Rivadavia (2006-2008)
  Livingston F.C. (2008-2009)
  Naval (2009)
  Deportivo Morón (2009)
  Deportes Naval (2010)
  Deportivo Maipú (2010)
  Gimnasia y Esgrima (CU) (2011-2012)
  Futbol Club Ferro Carril Sud (2012)
  Sport Boys Warnes (2012-2013)
  S.K. Victoria Wanderers F.C. (2013-now)

Notes

1985 births
Living people
Argentine footballers
Argentine expatriate footballers
Club Atlético Platense footballers
Independiente Rivadavia footballers
Deportivo Morón footballers
Godoy Cruz Antonio Tomba footballers
Naval de Talcahuano footballers
Primera B de Chile players
Expatriate footballers in Chile
Association football midfielders
Expatriate footballers in Scotland
Expatriate footballers in Portugal
Expatriate footballers in Bolivia
Expatriate footballers in Malta
Club Atlético Brown footballers
Livingston F.C. players
Associação Naval 1º de Maio players
Deportivo Maipú players
Gimnasia y Esgrima de Concepción del Uruguay footballers
Sport Boys Warnes players
Expatriate footballers in Peru
Sportspeople from Mendoza, Argentina